Two ships of the Royal Fleet Auxiliary have borne the name RFA Wave Knight:

  was a  oiler launched in 1945 and scrapped in 1964.
  is a  tanker launched in 2000 and in service as of 2009.

Royal Fleet Auxiliary ship names